Anna Ustyukhina (born 18 March 1989) is a water polo player from Russia. She was part of the Russian team at the 2016 Summer Olympics, where the team won the bronze medal.

See also
 Russia women's Olympic water polo team records and statistics
 List of Olympic medalists in water polo (women)
 List of women's Olympic water polo tournament goalkeepers
 List of World Aquatics Championships medalists in water polo

References

External links
 

Living people
1989 births
Russian female water polo players
Water polo goalkeepers
Olympic water polo players of Russia
Water polo players at the 2016 Summer Olympics
Olympic bronze medalists for Russia
Medalists at the 2016 Summer Olympics
Olympic medalists in water polo
Universiade bronze medalists for Russia
Universiade medalists in water polo
Medalists at the 2009 Summer Universiade
Medalists at the 2011 Summer Universiade
21st-century Russian women